Ebbe Siönäs (born March 7, 1995) is a Swedish professional ice hockey goaltender. He is currently playing with AIK IF in the Swedish SuperElit. Siönäs was placed by the NHL Central Scouting Bureau as the 2nd ranked European goaltender eligible for the 2013 NHL Entry Draft, however he was not selected.

Awards and honours

References

External links

1995 births
Living people
Swedish ice hockey goaltenders